The Ryde-Eastwood Rugby League Football Club is an Australian rugby league football club based in Ryde, New South Wales formed in late 1962, with the intent of entering the inaugural Inter-District competition in 1963.
This competition became known as Second Division from 1964. They currently play in the Sydney Shield. The club also fields open age (mens and womens) and under age (20s and 18s) teams in Sydney Combined competitions. 

The club has previously fielded teams in Balmain District and Parramatta District competitions.

Playing Record in NSWRL Competitions

Sydney Shield 
The club entered the Sydney Shield in 2019.

NSW Cup 
In a joint venture with Balmain Football Club, Balmain Ryde-Eastwood competed in the second-tier NSW Cup.

Second Division / Metropolitan Cup 
Ryde-Eastwood entered the Inter-District competition in 1963. This was renamed as Second Division in 1964 and reorganised as the Metropolitan Cup in 1974. The competition collapsed after the 1976 season. It was revived in 1990. Ryde-Eastwood were premiers on both sides of the 13 season hiatus.

AMCO Cup 
As the previous season's Second Division, Metropolitan Cup premiers, Ryde-Eastwood qualified for the Amco Cup knock-out competition on three consecutive occasions in the mid 1970s.

Sources

References 

Rugby league teams in Sydney
Rugby clubs established in 1962
1962 establishments in Australia
Ryde, New South Wales
Eastwood, New South Wales